Ravitch is a surname:

 Diane Ravitch (born 1938), a historian of education, educational policy analyst, and professor
 Richard Ravitch (born 1933), an American politician, businessman, and former Lieutenant Governor of New York
 Norman Ravitch, a professor emeritus of history at University of California, Riverside
Melech Ravitch (1893–1976), pen name of Zechariah Choneh Bergner, Canadian Yiddish writer